The following is a list of notable academic journals and magazines that are devoted to the study of specific authors and philosophers. Some of the journals are not currently active.